Seventh is the ordinal form of the number seven.

Seventh may refer to:
 Seventh Amendment to the United States Constitution
 A fraction (mathematics), equal to one of seven equal parts

Film and television
"The Seventh", a second-season episode of Star Trek: Enterprise

Music
 A seventh (interval), the difference between two pitches
 Diminished seventh, a chromatically reduced minor seventh interval
 Major seventh, the larger of two commonly occurring musical intervals that span seven diatonic scale degrees
 Minor seventh, the smaller of two commonly occurring musical intervals that span seven diatonic scale degrees
 Harmonic seventh, the interval of exactly 4:7, whose approximation to the minor seventh in equal temperament explains the "sweetness" of the dominant seventh chord in a major key
 Augmented seventh, an interval
 Leading-tone or subtonic, the seventh degree and the chord built on the seventh degree
 Seventh chord, a chord consisting of a triad plus a note forming an interval of a seventh above the chord root
 Seventh (chord), a factor of a chord
 Seventh, an Australian independent band who provided music for the 2001 video game Operation Flashpoint: Cold War Crisis
 The Seventh, stage name of American football player and singer-songwriter Chris Paul (American football)

See also
 Seventh Army (disambiguation)
 Seventh Avenue (disambiguation)
 Seventh day (disambiguation)
 Seventh Generation (disambiguation)
 Seventh Heaven (disambiguation)
 Seventh Sea (disambiguation)
 Seventh son of a seventh son (folk concept)
 Seventh Son of a Seventh Son (music album)